Abdelmalik Muktar (born 19 April 1996) is an Ethiopian swimmer. He competed in the men's 50 metre freestyle at the 2020 Summer Olympics.

References

External links
 

1996 births
Living people
Ethiopian male swimmers
Olympic swimmers of Ethiopia
Swimmers at the 2020 Summer Olympics
Place of birth missing (living people)
African Games competitors for Ethiopia
Swimmers at the 2019 African Games
21st-century Ethiopian people